Altendorf is a village in Saxony, Germany, situated in the district of Sächsische Schweiz-Osterzgebirge.  It lies on the S154 road that links Bad Schandau and Sebnitz. It was one of the villages that composed the municipality of Kirnitzschtal, but, since 1 October 2012, it has been part of the municipality of Sebnitz.

Sebnitz